Colorado Lawyer (commonly abbreviated Colo. Law.) is a monthly bar journal published by the Colorado Bar Association. The journal was established in 1971 and the editor-in-chief is Susie Klein.

External links 
 

American law journals
General law journals
Monthly journals
Publications established in 1971
English-language journals
Academic journals published by learned and professional societies
1971 establishments in Colorado